Doyle is a census-designated place (CDP) in San Patricio County, Texas, United States. The population was 254 at the 2010 census.

Geography
Doyle is located at  (27.886313, -97.343129).

Demographics
As of the census of 2000, there were 285 people, 110 households, and 76 families residing in the CDP. The population density was 338.2 people per square mile (131.0/km2). There were 129 housing units at an average density of 153.1/sq mi (59.3/km2). The racial makeup of the CDP was 77.89% White, 0.70% African American, 0.70% Native American, 15.44% from other races, and 5.26% from two or more races. Hispanic or Latino of any race were 43.51% of the population.

There were 110 households, out of which 28.2% had children under the age of 18 living with them, 48.2% were married couples living together, 15.5% had a female householder with no husband present, and 30.9% were non-families. 25.5% of all households were made up of individuals, and 9.1% had someone living alone who was 65 years of age or older. The average household size was 2.59 and the average family size was 3.14.

In the CDP, the population was spread out, with 25.6% under the age of 18, 8.4% from 18 to 24, 28.4% from 25 to 44, 23.2% from 45 to 64, and 14.4% who were 65 years of age or older. The median age was 39 years. For every 100 females, there were 100.7 males. For every 100 females age 18 and over, there were 94.5 males.

The median income for a household in the CDP was $27,857, and the median income for a family was $30,750. Males had a median income of $14,861 versus $16,607 for females. The per capita income for the CDP was $12,286. None of the families and 7.4% of the population were living below the poverty line, including no under eighteens and 12.5% of those over 64.

Education

Doyle is served by the Gregory-Portland Independent School District. All students in grades 9 through 12 in Doyle attend school at Gregory-Portland High School.

References

Census-designated places in San Patricio County, Texas
Census-designated places in Texas
Corpus Christi metropolitan area